Angeli's salt, sodium trioxodinitrate, is the inorganic compound with the formula Na2[N2O3]. It contains nitrogen in an unusual reduced state. It is a colorless, water-soluble solid, hence a salt. In research, this salt is used as a source of the metastable nitroxyl (HNO), which is a signalling molecule in nature. It is also known by the name sodium trioxodinitrate(II) monohydrate.

Preparation and properties 
As first reported by Angelo Angeli in 1896, the salt is prepared by combining hydroxylamine and an organic nitrate, as a source of nitronium:
NH2OH  +  RONO2  +  2 NaOR′  →   ROH  + 2 R′OH  +  Na2N2O3

The structure of the hydrate has been confirmed by X-ray crystallography. The anion is planar. Starting from the ONN end, the bond distances are 1.35 Å (N−O), 1.26 Å (N−N), 1.31 Å (N−O), and 1.32 Å (N−-O). The negative charge is on the oxygen atoms at opposite ends of the molecule. The angles are 112.9° (Osingle−N−N), 118.4° (N−N−Otrans), and 122.5° (N−N−Ocis). This means that the nitrogen–nitrogen bond is a double bond, and that the cis oxygen is slightly repelled by the single oxygen.

Reaction of Angeli's salt with secondary amines in the presence of a proton source results in extrusion of N2 via isodiazenes as proposed intermediates.

References

Nitrites
Sodium compounds